The BANK of Greenland is one of two commercial banks in Greenland, listed on the Copenhagen Stock Exchange as GRLA, with 2,700 shareholders in 2017. Headquartered in Nuuk, the bank had 118 employees in 2017.

History 
The Bank of Greenland was founded on 26 May 1967 by a number of Danish banks, during the era when Greenland was still a province of Denmark. The founding banks were Privatbanken, Danske Bank, Kjøbenhavns Handelsbank, and an organization of local banks, provincial and Copenhagen-based. Operations started in Nuuk on 1 July 1967, while local branches in Ilulissat, Sisimiut, and Qaqortoq followed in 1985, and in Maniitsoq in 1989.

On 8 June 1985 the bank merged with Nuna Bank (formerly Bikuben), with the capital of 120 million Danish krone (DKK), retaining the name of Grønlandsbanken, and becoming the only commercial bank in the country.

Later, the BankNordik, which has its headquarters on the Faroe Islands, established itself as a competitor with an office in Nuuk, Greenland (BankNordik also has offices in the Faroe Islands).

Operations 

The Bank of Greenland provides commercial services, as well as products and services for private customers such as loans, specialized and automated deposits, and property trading and administration. With 50,000 customers, the Bank of Greenland has branches in major towns in Greenland, while bank operations in small settlements are handled via the integrated Post Greenland offices in the Pilersuisoq all-purpose stores.

Banca Transilvania deal 
The Romanian Banca Transilvania offered in the beginning of 2018 DKK 1.14 Billion for the Bank of Greenland. The Bank of Greenland did not respond to this offer.

See also

Economy of Greenland
List of banks in Greenland

References

Banks established in 1967
Banks of Greenland
Nuuk
1967 establishments in Greenland